Kholida Dadaboeva (born 12 April 1993) is an Uzbekistani footballer who plays as a defender. She is also a futsal player, and represented Uzbekistan internationally in both football and futsal.

Club career
Dadaboeva has played for Metallurg in Uzbekistan.

International career
Dadaboeva has been capped for Uzbekistan at senior level in both football and futsal. In football, she represented Uzbekistan at the 2018 AFC Women's Asian Cup qualification.

In futsal, Dadaboeva played for Uzbekistan at the 2018 AFC Women's Futsal Championship.

References

1993 births
Living people
Uzbekistani women's footballers
Women's association football defenders
Uzbekistan women's international footballers
Uzbekistani women's futsal players
20th-century Uzbekistani women
21st-century Uzbekistani women